Tavernette is a frazione (neighbourhood) of Cumiana, in Piedmont, northern Italy.
 
Its name comes from the latin tabernae  (in English tavern or country pub).

Geography 

It is a borough located in the Chisola Valley, in the easternmost part of Cottian Alps, some kilometers south-east from the centre of Cumiana. The Monte Tre Denti and Monte Freidour peaks are located nearby.

History 
Since 1928 Tavernette was a separate comune (municipality); before 1801 it also encompassed the present-day municipality of Piscina, located in the Po plain.

References

Frazioni of the Province of Turin
Former municipalities of the Province of Turin
Cumiana